Saarenpää is a Finnish surname. Notable people with the surname include:

Klebér Saarenpää (born 1975), Swedish footballer and manager
Seppo Saarenpää (born 1937), Finnish sport shooter

Finnish-language surnames
Surnames of Finnish origin